Koreans in China, Korean Chinese, Joseonjok, Chosŏnjok, or Chaoxianzu are all ethnic Koreans with Chinese nationality/citizenship. A majority of the chaoxianzu are descendants of immigrants from Korean peninsula from recent immigration. The Chinese government officially recognize them as one of the 56 ethnicities being part of the 55 ethnic minorities in China. They are the 13th largest minority group in China. Their total population was estimated at 1,923,842  and 1,830,929 according to the 2010 Chinese census. High levels of emigration to the Republic of Korea for better economic and financial opportunities, which has conversely reported a large increase of Korean Chinese in Korea, are the likely cause of the drop in China. Most of them live in South Korea and Yanbian Korean Autonomous Prefecture. They are also located in Heilongjiang, Liaoning, and Inner Mongolia Autonomous Region.

The population of Koreans in China include millions of descendants of Korean immigrants with People's Republic of China citizenship, as well as smaller groups of South and North Korean expatriates, totalling roughly 2.5 million people , making it the second largest ethnic Korean population living outside the Korean Peninsula, after the United States.

Terminology
In South Korea, the terminology used to this group changed to be more friendly in recent times. In the 1990s, South Korean media referred to Koreans in China as jungguk-in ("Chinese people"). Government regulations in 2004 mandated the use of the term jaeoe dongpo ("compatriots who live abroad"). Similarly friendly terms include hanguk gye jungguk-in ("Chinese people of Korean descent") and jungguk dongpo (compatriots in China).

The term joseon-jok ("Joseon person") is also used, mainly in mainland China, but has been criticized by Koreans in China for being a less amicable term than those for other overseas Koreans like Korean Americans (jaemi gyopo, 在美僑胞, "compatriots in America") or Koreans in Japan (jaeil gyopo, 在日僑胞, "compatriots in Japan").

History
Due to the geographic proximity between China and the Korean Peninsula, population migration of some kind had often occurred throughout history. However, most early ethnic Koreans in China had been assimilated by the Han Chinese, Manchus and Mongols. Thus, the overwhelming majority of today's ethnic Korean population in China are descendants of recent Korean arrivals.

Early history 
After the conclusion of the Goguryeo–Tang War CE 645 - 668, over 200,000 Korean prisoners from Goguryeo were transported by the victorious Tang forces to the Chinese capital Chang'an.

During the 8th and 9th centuries since Silla, large Korean communities in China settled on the Shandong Peninsula and at the mouth of the Yangtze River.

Liao to early Qing era 
According to records of History of Liao, Khitans set up a Samhan county, in Zhongjing Circuit (中京道), one of the Liao's 5 "circuits", after Goryeo–Khitan War to settle prisoners of wars. In the Yuan dynasty, Koreans were included along with Northern Chinese, Khitan and Jurchen in the third class, as "Han people". Korean settlements in the Yuan Dynasty were mostly war-related. In 1233, former Goryeo commander Hong Bok-won and his followers moved to the current-day Liaoyang and Shenyang areas of Liaoning Province in Northeast China after his surrender to the Mongols during the Mongol invasions of Korea, and was offered an administrator position to take charge of Korean population there. In the next years, another ten thousand Goryeo households were brought under his administration. In 1266, Wang Jun, a member of the Goryeo royal family, was sent to the Mongol Empire as a hostage. There were 2,000 Goryeo households accompanying him and settling down in the current-day Shenyang city. 

The Korean population in China surged during the Ming dynasty. According to Chronicles of Liaodong, Koreans and Manchus accounted for 30% of the total local population in Northeast China. In 1386, the Ming government set up the Dongningwei and Guangningwei to settle the increasing Korean population. Between the mid-15th century and the early 16th century, the Liaodong Peninsula experienced a peaceful and prosperous era. Favorable policies were carried out towards ethnic minority in areas like Dongningwei. Many Koreans moved from the Korean Peninsula to Northeast China to enjoy such favorable policies. However, as the rising power of Jianzhou Jurchens grew stronger and stronger, Koreans began to move out of Dongningwei. In 1537, the Korean population in Dongningwei had decreased by 60%.

As Jurchens established the Later Jin, military clashes between Jurchens and Koreans increased. During the two Jurchen invasions of the Korean Peninsula, they plundered large numbers of Korean people. Most of these Koreans captured by Jurchens were drafted as soldiers into the Eight Banners or sold to rich Jurchens as farm laborers or servants. Most of the captured Koreans in the early Qing dynasty were forcefully converted to Manchu or other ethnicities, and lost their ethnic identities.

Late Qing era
In 1677, Manchus sealed the area north of Baekdu Mountain, Yalu River, and Tumen River as a conservation area of their ancestors' birthplace, and prohibited Koreans and other non-Manchu ethnic people from entering the area. The Joseon rulers were also forced by the Qing government to implement harsh penalties to prevent Koreans from entering the sealed areas. As a result, the areas became obsolete with no human settlements. But there were still Koreans living nearby who took the risk to collect ginseng, hunt animals, or cultivate agricultural products in the prohibited area. In 1740, the Qing government extended the ban to the whole Northeast China region.

During the second half of the nineteenth century, Northeast China increasingly became obsolete after 200 years of Manchus' closure to the region. The Russian Empire meanwhile seized the opportunity to encroach this region. In 1860, the Qing government was forced to sign the Convention of Peking and ceded more than 1 million square kilometers to the Russians.  Pressed by the situations, the Qing government lifted the ban on Northeast China in 1860, and lifted the ban on the Yalu River and Tumen River area in 1875 and 1881 respectively. During the years between 1860 and 1870, several unprecedented natural disasters struck the northern part of the Korean Peninsula. Meanwhile, peasant revolts in the south spread to the north. Large numbers of Korean refugees moved to the north banks of the Tumen and Yalu rivers during those turbulent times. In 1879, there were 8722 Korean households living in 28 villages in Tonghua, Huairen, Kuandian, Xinbin areas, with a total population of more than 37,000. In 1881, the Qing government established a special bureau to recruit farmers to cultivate the land and allocated the 700 by 45-square-kilometer area north of the Tumen River as the special farming areas for Korean farmers. The Qing government strengthened the management of Korean emigrants during the start of the 20th century. Korean emigrants were able to obtain land ownership if they were willing to adopt Manchu's dress codes such as the Queue hairstyle and pay taxes to the Qing government. But most of the Korean emigrants considered adopting Manchu's addressing codes a discriminatory policy of assimilation. By 1910, the number of Korean migrants in China reached about 260,000, with around 100,000 of them living in the current-day Yanbian Korean Autonomous Prefecture.

Development of paddy fields in Northeast China
The development of paddy fields in Northeast China during the modern era was related to rice cultivation by Korean emigrants. Korean emigrants attempted to cultivate rice in the Hun River valley as early as 1848. The experiment by Korean farmers in the Dandong region was successful in 1861. In 1875, Korean farmers also succeeded in cultivating rice in the wetland of Huanren region in Liaoning province. The cultivation of rice in Yanbian region began in 1877. The growth of paddy fields brings the further development of irrigation projects in Northeast China by Korean farmers, who built numerous watering canals to irrigate paddy fields. In June 1906, 14 Korean farmers built the earliest irrigation system in Yanbian. The total length of canals built exceeded 1.3 kilometer, irrigating 33 hectare of paddy fields.

On 3 March 1914, the newly established Republic of China issued a decree aimed to encourage land development in Northeastern China. In the same year, the water bureau of the Mukden province began to recruit Korean emigrants to use the water from Hun River to develop paddy fields near Mukden. In 1916, the local government of Jilin Province submitted a paddy field farming specifications document of a Korean immigrant farmer to the central Agriculture and Business Administration. After receiving the administration's approval, Jinlin Province started to promote rice production. Han Chinese farmer began to hire Korean emigrants to learn how to grow rice. In 1917, Korean farmers in Muling solved the problem of how to grow rice in regions with short frost-free period. Rice farming thereafter quickly expanded to the further north region of Mudan River, Muling River and Mayi River basins.

Between 1921 and 1928, the total areas of paddy fields in Northeast China increased from 48,000 hectare to 125,000 hectares, more than 80% of these rice fields was developed or cultivated by Korean farmers. In 1933, Korean farmers succeeded in growing rice in Aihui and Xunke area along Amur River, breaking the world record of growing rice north of the 50th parallel north. In 1934, Korean population accounted for only 3.3% of Northeast China's total population, but produced 90.1% of the rice outputs there.

During the Japanese Occupation of Korea
After the Japanese Occupation of Korea in 1910, thousands of Koreans fled to Northeast China or other regions of China to escape Japanese rule. Many Korean independence movement activists and organizations established independent movement activity bases or military training schools in Northeast China and purposely move Korean people to China. In 1919, after the cracking-down of the March 1st Movement by Japanese police, Korean political refugees moving to China reached the peak. In 1920, the total number of Koreans in Northeast China exceeded 457,400. 

During 1910–1934, cadastral land surveys and rice production promotion plans carried out by Governor-General of Korea forced thousands of disadvantaged Korean farmers to lose their land ownership or go to bankruptcy. Since there were no large enough urban industry to absorb these redundant rural population, the Japanese started to migrate these Korean farmers to Northeast China.  At the same time, the newly established Republic of China was promoting land developments in Northeast China. This offered a favorable condition for the Japanese population migration policy. After the Chinese government issued the national wild land development decree on 3 March 1914, the water bureau of Mukden Province began to hire Korean emigrants to develop paddy fields near Mukden using the water from Hun River. Since Korean farmers had succeeded in growing rice in Northeast China in large scale and the price of rice in Japan kept climbing every year, the Japanese started to increase their paddy fields in Northeast China each year and hire Korean emigrants to grow rice.

The Fengtian clique in Northeast China maintained a complicated relationship with the Japanese. They sometimes cooperated with the Japanese and sometimes were at odds with them. To fight for the control of Korean emigrants, the Fengtian clique attempted to persuade or force Korean emigrants to become naturalized citizens of China. But most Korean emigrants considered such policies as Chinese authority's attempt to assimilate them into Han Chinese. In September 1930, realizing that Korean emigrants had little trust in Chinese governments, the Chairman of Jinlin Province Zhang Zuoxiang instead carried out policies to encourage Korean emigrants to become naturalized.  To prevent the Japanese from using Korean emigrants as a tool of infiltration into Northeast China, the Chinese government also tried to put Korean immigrants' schools into its own national education system, increasing investments on Korean schools annually to sever the Japanese influence on Korean emigrants. In 1921, Jinlin province quadrupled its annual investments on local Korean schools to repair the damages during the Japanese massacre of Koreans(間島慘變) in Oct. 1920. As the Japanese often used the excuse of protecting Korean emigrants to enlarge their sphere of influence in Northeast China, the views of Chinese government and people towards Korean emigrants changed after the mid of 1920, especially after the exposure of Tanaka Memorial and the Wanpaoshan Incident. Korean emigrants used to be considered as independent activists in China, but now they were generally considered as the vanguard of Japanese invasion. Relationship between local Chinese and Korean emigrants became tense. After the Chinese government signed the treaty with the Japanese government on 11 June 1925 to assist the Japanese get rid of Korean independent activists in Northeast China, the Fengtian clique began to use this treaty to expel and persecute Korean emigrants and began to take back the farm lands cultivated by non-naturalized Korean emigrants or put on more restrictions. Naturalized Korean emigrants, however, continue to have the rights to own farm lands.

Under these circumstances, Korean emigrants in Northeast China began to have the consensus of becoming naturalized and actively seeking local autonomy. Many anti-Japanese Korean organizations took measures to protect Korean emigrants and negotiated local Chinese governments into making concessions or acquiescence. In 1928, Zhang Xueliang replaced the Beiyang government flag in Northeast China with Republic of China's flag, after the Huanggutun incident. Many Korean independent organizations seized this good opportunity to encourage Korean emigrants in Northeast China to apply for Chinese citizenship. On 10 September 1928, Korean emigrants in Northeast China established the Korean autonomy organization "Korean Fellow Association" (韓橋同鄕會). In April, the leader of Korean Fellow Association Cui Dongwu went to Nanjing and hold negotiations with the Nationalist government on various issues about Korean emigrants' naturalization and autonomy. These negotiations helped to facilitate the naturalization process for Korean emigrants, but failed in establishing Korean autonomy.

In 1931, Japan staged the Mukden Incident and invaded Northeast China by force, then established a puppet state called Manchukuo.  On 14 September 1936, the Japanese set up a special organization (滿鮮拓殖會社) and began to migrate Korean farmers to Northeast China in a planned systemic way. In 1945, when Japan surrendered at the end of World War II, there were more than 2.16 million Korean emigrants living in Northeast China. Among them, about 700,000 returned to Korea after the end of World War II. In 1947, the number of Korean emigrants decreased to 1.4 million, most of them living in the communist party controlled areas, only less than 100,000 living in the Kuomintang-controlled areas.

Anti-Japanese fights
On 13 March 1919 shortly after the March 1st Movement in Korea, around 300,000 Koreans in Yanbian rallied on the Ruidian meadow in Longjing to protest against the Japanese and demonstrate supports for the 1 March Movement. This is the first massive grassroot anti-Japanese demonstration in Yanbian.  A declaration of independence drafted by Yanbian Koreans was read out at the rally. The crowd then marched towards the Japanese consulate in Longjing, chanting anti-Japanese slogans and waving Taegukgi and placards. The crowd was stopped by Fengtian clique soldiers and Japanese police near the west gate of the Japanese consulate. Bullets were fired towards the demonstrators. 19 people were killed, 48 injured and 94 arrested. From 13 March to 1 May, a total of 73 anti-Japanese Korean rallies broke out in 15 counties in Northeast China. The total number of people participated in these demonstrations exceed 100,000.

In June 1920, the Korean independence fighters led by Hong Beom-do engaged the first armed force combat with the Imperial Japanese Army in Wangqing County, killing more than 100 Japanese soldiers. This led to the "Gando massacre" a few months later in Yanbian. The Japanese army killed 15,000 Koreans and destroyed more than 3,500 houses, 95 schools, 19 churches and nearly 25,000 kg grains. Between 21 and 26 October 1920, the combined Korean Liberation Army forces led by Kim Chwa-chin, Lee Beom-seok and Hong Beom-do fought the Battle of Qingshanli against Imperial Japanese Army in Helong. Local Korean residents provided vital supports for the Korean Liberation Army.

In the 1930s, many Koreans in China joined the Anti-Japanese forces led by the Chinese Communist Party. In June 1932, Korean leader Li Hongguang established one of the earliest Anti-Japanese Volunteer Armies (磐石工農義勇軍) in Northeast China. Most of its members were ethnic Koreans in China. Li later became a Key member of The Northeast Anti-Japanese United Army. Among the 11 army divisions of the Northeast Anti-Japanese United Army, Koreans accounted for half of the total number in the 1st, 2nd,3rd and 7th army division. During the 14 years of fight against the Japanese, Northeast Anti-Japanese United Army killed 183,700 Japanese soldiers.

Resumption of Chinese Civil War (1946–1949)
After the end of Second World War, Kuomintang forces took over the Northeast China from the Soviet Red Army. The Kuomintang initially implemented similar policies towards both Korean and Japanese people, impounding or confiscating Korean properties and repatriating Korean emigrants. Since Korean farmers played important roles in rice production in Northeast China, the Kuomintang revoked this hostile policy towards Koreans in China after the intervention of Provisional Government of the Republic of Korea and even took measures to persuade Korean farmers to stay in China to prevent possible declines in rice production in Northeast China. 

In contrast to the Kuomintang, the Chinese Communist Party had been very friendly towards Koreans in China. Koreans had a long history of friendship with the Chinese communists. Koreans participated in both the Nanchang Uprising and Guangzhou Uprising, and contributed to the establishment of the Chinese Communist Party's army and the base of the Chinese Red Army in the Jinggang Mountains.  The Chinese Communist Party considered Koreans in China as the same class of people in China who were oppressed and exploited by both the Imperial Japanese and feudal warlords in China, and a reliable source of support in the fight against the Imperial Japanese and feudal warlords. In July 1928, the Chinese Communist Party officially included Koreans in China as one of the ethnic minorities of China on its 6th National Conference. After the Japanese invasion of Northeast China, cooperation between the communists and Koreans in China strengthened and the social status of Koreans among the communists rose to new heights.  the Chinese Communists let the Koreans choose whether to voluntarily become Chinese citizens and left them ample time and options to choose.  In March 1946, Northeast China started the Land Reform Movement, allocating the land formerly occupied by the Japanese or rich Chinese and rich Koreans. Korean farmers in China received farmland just as other Chinese farmers did.  From October 1947, the land reform was expanded to nationwide.

During the War of Liberation, 63,000 Koreans from Northeast China joined the People's Liberation Army, more than 100,000 joined local military forces and hundreds of thousands participated logistics supports. Soldiers in the 164th, 166th and 156th of the Fourth Field Army are mostly Koreans. They participated in the Siege of Changchun, Battle of Siping, Liaoshen Campaign, then continued to fight as far as in the Hainan Island Campaign.

Since 1949
After the founding of the People's Republic of China in 1949, Koreans in China became one of the official members of Zhonghua minzu. The total population of Koreans in China was 1.1 million, 47.6% of them living in Yanbian. In September 1949, Zhu Dehai, the chairman and local specialist of Chinese Communist Party in Yanbian attended the first plenary session of Chinese People's Political Consultative Conference (CPPCC) as one of the 10 ethnic minorities, participated in the establishment of CPPCC as a representative of Koreans in China. He also attended the grand ceremony for the founding of the People's Republic of China.

After the outbreak of Korean War in 1950, young Koreans in China actively joined the People's Volunteer Army in response to the Chinese Communist Party's call. These bilingual soldiers provided valuable communications help to other Chinese soldiers with locals in Korea in addition to manpower. Zhao Nanqi, Li Yongtai are two of the most notable Korean figures who participated in the war. Koreans in Longjing also organized the "Yanji Jet" donation campaign. Donations from Koreans in Yanbian reached the equivalent value of 6.5 jet fighters after the  enormous destruction caused by the American Bombing of North Korea. 

On 3 March 1952, Yanbian was officially designated as a Korean Autonomous Region and Zhu Dehai was appointed as the first Chairman. On 20 July 1954, the first session of People's Congress was held in Yanbian. In April 1955, "Yanbian Korean Autonomous Region" was renamed as "Yanbian Korean Autonomous Prefecture" per the stipulation of the first Constitution of People's Republic of China and Zhu Dehai was appointed as the first Chairman. On 29 May 1958, the State Council of the People's Republic of China approved the decision to designate Changbai County as "Changbai Korean Autonomous County".

During the Cultural Revolution, many Korean cadres including Zhu Dehai were prosecuted as capitalist roaders, local nationalists or counterrevolutionists. Many faculty members of Yanbian University were also prosecuted. The number of Yanbian University's faculty and staff decreased to 23.7% of that in 1966. Even Korean Language was criticized as Four Olds. After the Cultural Revolution ended, things gradually restored to normal.  

On 24 April 1985, the eighth session of the People's Congress of Yanbian Korean Autonomous Prefecture passed the "Autonomy Regulations of Korean Autonomous Prefecture", which was later approved by the sixth session of Jilin Province People's Congress as law. The Yanbian Autonomy Regulations consist of 7 chapters and 75 clauses. It stipulated political, economic, cultural, educational, and social rights of and policies for Korean and other ethnic people in Yanbian Autonomous Prefecture in the form of law. It is the first autonomy regulations in China's history. These regulations stipulated that the Chairman of the Standing Committee of the Prefectural People's Congress should be a Korean, and that Koreans may occupy more than half the posts within the Prefectural People's Government as vice mayors, the chief secretary, directors of bureaus, and so on. Other regulations require the use of both Korean and Chinese languages while performing governmental duties, with Korean being the principal language used, along with encouraging the use of Korean in local primary and middle school.

In September 1994, Yanbian Korean Autonomous Prefecture was selected by the State Council of the People's Republic of China as a "Model Autonomous Prefecture". Yanbian was the first autonomous prefecture in China to receive this title and it had continuously received this title five times. According to a 2012 paper, the Chaoxianzu are seen as a model minority and have good relations with both the Chinese government and Han majority.

Culture

Education

Koreans in China have a tradition of education. The education level of Koreans in China is above China's national average and one of the highest among ethnic groups in China. The Chinese government is also very supportive in preserving their language and culture. Korean schools from kindergarten to higher education are allowed to teach in Korean language in Yanbian. Yanbian University located in Yanji city is a comprehensive university offering bachelor to doctoral degrees. The university is one of the Project 211 national key university and a member of the Double First Class University Plan.

There are also many South Korean international day schools in Mainland China, including Korean International School in Beijing, Guangzhou Korea School, Korean International School in Shenzhen, Korean International School in Yanbian, Korean School in Yantai, Shanghai Korean School,  etc. In addition, the Shenzhen Korean Chamber of Commerce and Industry organizes a Korean Saturday school because many Korean students are not studying in Korean-medium schools; the school had about 600 students in 2007. The chamber uses rented space in the Overseas Chinese Town (OCT) Primary School as the Korean weekend school's classroom. There is also the Korean International School of Hong Kong.

Religion
The majority of ethnic Koreans in China have no formal affiliations with a religion. Major religions among ethnic Koreans in China include Buddhism and Christianity (with service in Korean).

Public Media
The Korean language has been promoted in Yanbian partly by the government through a large network of schools, local Korean periodicals and television broadcasts, as well as a local law mandating all street signs be written in Korean and Chinese. Most ethnic Koreans in China speak Mandarin Chinese and many also speak fluent Korean as their mother tongue. Many Chinese of Korean descent have ancestral roots  and family ties in the Hamgyong region of North Korea and speak the Hamgyŏng dialect of Korean according to North Korean conventions.

However, since South Korea has been more prolific in exporting its entertainment culture, more Korean Chinese broadcasters have been using Seoul dialect. The so-called Korean Wave (Hallyu) has influenced fashion styles.

In public appearances, ethnic Koreans in China are represented by the wearing of Chosŏn-ot, which caused discontent from South Korean ultra-nationalists during the 2022 Winter Olympics opening ceremony.

North Koreans 

China has a large number of North Korean refugees, estimated in the tens of thousands. Some North Korean refugees who are unable to obtain transport to South Korea instead marry chaoxianzu and settle down in China, blending into the community; however, they are still subject to deportation if discovered by the authorities. Although the PRC government estimated 10,000 refugees in the country, the United Nations alleged between 30,000 and 50,000 refugees, of which 75 percent are women. Sexual assault, forced marriage, and human trafficking of North Korean refugees in China is common. Most of the refugees originate from North Hamgyong Province. As China deports the majority of North Koreans under a 1986 agreement with North Korea, 86 percent of refugees seek passage to South Korea rather than remain in China. According to a 2015 UC Santa Cruz paper, many North Korean refugees met locals who gave aid to them and did not judge them for their communist origins.

North Koreans seen as politically reliable by their government can acquire passports and visas for travelling to China. , there are an estimated 4,000 to 5,000 North Koreans residing as legal resident aliens in China. An increasing number are applying for naturalization as Chinese citizens; this requires a certificate of loss of North Korean nationality, which North Korean authorities have recently become more reluctant to issue. Major North Korean universities, such as the Kim Il-sung University and the Pyongyang University of Foreign Studies, send a few dozen exchange students to Peking University and other top-ranked Chinese universities each year.

In June 2012, the Los Angeles Times reported that Beijing and Pyongyang had signed an agreement to grant as many as 40,000 industrial trainee visas to North Koreans to permit them to work in China per year; the first batch of workers arrived earlier in the year in the city of Tumen in Yanbian Korean Autonomous Prefecture. There have been reportedly 130 North Korean state-run restaurants in 12 countries, with most in China. Two have been found in Beijing, three in Shanghai, and others in Dandong.

South Koreans
After the 1992 normalization of diplomatic relations between the PRC and South Korea, many citizens of South Korea started to settle in Mainland China; large new communities of South Koreans have subsequently formed in Beijing, Shanghai, Dalian and Qingdao. The South Korean government officially recognizes seven Korean international schools in China (in Yanbian, Beijing, Shanghai, Tianjin, Yantai, Qingdao, and Dalian, respectively), all founded between 1997 and 2003. Most of the population of Koreans in Hong Kong consists of South Korea migrant workers.

Typically, they come to China as employees of South Korean corporations on short-term international assignments or as employers of South Korean businesses operating in China handling Chinese workers; when their assignments are completed, many prefer to stay on in China, using the contacts they have made to start their own consulting businesses or import/export firms. Other South Koreans moved to China on their own after becoming unemployed during the 1997 financial crisis; they used funds they had saved up for retirement to open small restaurants or shops. The low cost of living compared to Seoul, especially the cheap tuition at international schools teaching English and Chinese, is another pull factor for temporary South Korean migration to Mainland China but usually after this period, those that have moved have mostly gone back to Korea.

The number of South Koreans in China was estimated to be 300,000 to 400,000 ; at the 2006 rate of growth, their population had been expected to reach one million by 2008. By 2007, the South Korean Embassy in Beijing stated their population had reached 700,000. However, due to the global economic downturn in 2008 and the depreciation of the Korean won, large numbers of those returned to South Korea. A Bloomberg News article initially stated the proportion as 20% (roughly 140,000 people). Between 2008 and 2009, South Korean government figures show that the number of Koreans in China dropped by 433,000. The Sixth National Population Census of the People's Republic of China reported 120,750 South Koreans in Mainland China, the largest single foreign group.

By city

Shandong
As of 2008 there are more than 148,000 Koreans living in Shandong.

Shenzhen
 there were about 20,000 people of Korean origins in Shenzhen, with the Nanshan and Futian districts having significant numbers. That year the chairperson of the Korean Chamber of Commerce and Industry, Kang Hee-bang, stated that about 10,000 lived in Overseas Chinese Town (OCT). Shekou, the area around Shenzhen University, and Donghai Garden housing estate had other significant concentrations. Donghai Garden began attracting Koreans due to its transportation links and because, around 1998, it was the sole residential building classified as 3-A.  Donghai had about 200 Korean families.

South Koreans began going to the Shenzhen area during the 1980s as part of the reform and opening up era, and this increased when South Korea established formal diplomatic relations with the PRC.

In 2007 about 500 South Korean companies in Shenzhen were involved in China-South Korean trade, and there were an additional 500 South Korean companies doing business in Shenzhen. In 2007 Kang stated that most of the Koreans in Shenzhen had lived there for five years or longer.

 there were some Korean children enrolled in schools for Chinese locals.  spaces for foreign students in Shenzhen public schools were limited, so some Korean residents are forced to put their children in private schools. In addition, in 2007, there were about 900 Korean children in non-Chinese K-12 institutions; the latter included 400 of them at private international schools in Shekou, 300 in private schools in Luohu District, and 200 enrolled at the Baishizhou Bilingual School. Because many Korean students are not studying in Korean-medium schools, the Korean Chamber of Commerce and Industry operates a Korean Saturday School; it had about 600 students in 2007. The chamber uses rented space in the OCT Primary School as the Korean weekend school's classroom.

Notable people

Historical figures
Kim Gyo-gak, the Ksitigarbha at Mount Jiuhua (Originally from the Kingdom of Silla)
Yi Tong (義通), the 16th patriarch of the Tiantai school
Kim Ho-shang, Korean Ch'an master who introduced the first streams of Ch'an Buddhism to Tibet
Senglang (僧朗, in Korean Sungnang), 6th century Goguryeo monk who went to China; his works heavily influenced Jizang and Zhouyoung and the Sanlun school.
Gao Xianzhi, a Tang general of Korean Goguryeo descent
Gao Yun, Emperor of Later Yan and Northern Yan of Goguryeo descent
Li Zhengji, general of the Tang dynasty
Li Na, general of the Tang dynasty
Li Shigu, general of the Tang dynasty
Li Shidao, general of the Tang dynasty
Wonch'uk, one of the two pupils of Hsüan-tsang, his work was revered and heavily influenced Tibetan Buddhism and Chinese Buddhism.
Chegwan, (諦觀; 960–962), Korean Buddhist monk who arrived in China, who wrote the Tiantai Sijiaoyi (天台四教儀) which became a basic T'ien-t'ai text.
Empress Gi (Originally from the Goyang, Kingdom of Goryeo)
Li Chengliang, general of the Ming dynasty
Li Rusong, general of the Ming dynasty
Li Rubai, general of the Ming dynasty

Contemporary Chaoxianzu/Joseonjok
Jiang Jingshan (姜景山; Korean:강경산), Aerospace scientist, Fellow of Chinese Academy of Engineering
Jin Hongguang (金红光; Korean:김홍광), Physical Chemist, Fellow of Chinese Academy of Sciences
Jin Ningyi (金宁一; Korean:김녕일), Virologist, Fellow of Chinese Academy of Engineering
Jin Xianzhai (金显宅; Korean:김현택), Oncologist, known as "The Father of Chinese Oncology"  
Gong Hyeon-U (孔铉佑), Vice Minister of foreign affairs of China and 
(林贤郁), Former Deputy Director of the National Bureau of Statistics of China
Bai Lei (白磊), Chinese football player
Jin Yan (金焰), renowned actor of the 1930s 
Cui Jian (崔健; Korean:최건), Chinese rock musician, composer, trumpet player and guitarist; also known as "The Father of Chinese Rock"
Han Dayuan (韩大元), Dean of Renmin University of China Law School and Director of the Constitutional Law Institute of China Law Society
Hee Geum, Korean author
Jin Xing (金星; Korean:김성), dancer, choreographer and actress
Zhang Lü (张律; Korean:장률), film director, screenwriter and novelist
Li Yongtai, (李永泰; Korean:리영태), member of the 9th NPC Standing Committee, Deputy Commander of the People's Liberation Army Air Force
Piao Wenyao (朴文垚), professional Go player
Joe Wong (黄西), Chinese–American comedian and chemical engineer
Zhao Nanqi (赵南起; Korean:조남기), People's Liberation Army general, former vice chairman of the Chinese People's Political Consultative Conference
Li Xianyu (李贤玉; Korean:리현옥), Fellow of Chinese Academy of Engineering, the first female general of People's Liberation Army Rocket Force
Zheng Lücheng (郑律成; Korean:정률성), composer of the Military Anthem of the People's Liberation Army 
Jin Longguo (金龙国; Korean: 김용국), soloist and former member of South Korean Boy Band JBJ
Jin Yulin (金雨霖; Korean: 김우림; Stage name: D.Ark), rapper based in South Korea under P Nation
Jin Bo: Chinese footballer.
Huáng Rénjùn (黄仁俊; Korean: 황인준), member of boygroup NCT DREAM based in South Korea under SM Entertainment

Expatriates of other nationalities and their descendants
Kwon Ki-ok, one of the first female pilots in China (Originally from Pyongyang, North Korea)
Pak Cholsu (박철수), head representative of the North Korean government-run company, Taep'oong International Investment Group of Korea (조선대풍국제투자그룹)
Howie Liu, American-born CEO of Airtable

See also 
Ethnic Chinese in Korea
General Association of Koreans in China
Korean Chinese cuisine
Harbin No. 2 Korean Middle School
Yanbian Korean Autonomous Prefecture
Koreans in Beijing
Korean community of Shanghai
Koreans in Hong Kong
Pyongyang (restaurant chain)

Notes

References

Citations

Sources

External links
Koreans in China Online Community  - Moyiza!
环球阿里郎 Arirang World

 
 
China
 
 
Ethnic groups officially recognized by China
China–Korea relations
Immigration to China